The Gyeongju Folk Craft Village is a village at the foothills of Toman mountain, in the neighborhood of Ha-dong, Gyeongju, North Gyeongsang province, South Korea. The village was established in 1986 to preserve and develop crafts of the Silla kingdom. It consists of hanok or traditional Korean houses including 45 thatched houses (called choga) and roof-titled houses (giwajip) where artisans of the Gyeongju origin live and work.

Gallery

See also
Yangdong Village of Gyeongju

References

External links
 The official site

Tourist attractions in Gyeongju
Korean art
Buildings and structures in Gyeongju